Josy Van Leberghe was a Belgian figure skater. She competed with Robert Van Zeebroeck in the mixed pairs event at the 1928 Winter Olympics where they finished in sixth place.

References

External links
 
 

Date of birth missing
Place of birth missing
Date of death missing
Place of death missing
Olympic figure skaters of Belgium
Figure skaters at the 1928 Winter Olympics
Belgian female pair skaters